Gink Scootere is the fifth studio album by King Creosote. It was released in 1998 on Fence Records.

Track listing
 Dr. Alcopop 
 Huckleberry Homeboy 
 Thinners 
 Crushing Bach Piano
 Marsha 
 Lone Pigeon 
 Your Crappy day 
 One and the same 
 Breeze once more on me 
 Leslie 
 Outer Crail to Inner Space
 Whatsover 
 Dankety Dank 
 Hello for the last time
 Sighs Mattress

1998 albums
King Creosote albums